The Orchestre de la Francophonie is a Canadian symphony orchestra based in Montreal. It was founded in as temporary orchestra to play at the 2001 Jeux de la Francophonie (Francophone Games) in Canada. However, it went on to become a permanent orchestra which specializes in training young musicians. The average age of the members is 24. Half of them come from Quebec with the remainder from other Canadian provinces and French-speaking countries. The orchestra's founding Artistic Director and chief conductor is Jean-Philippe Tremblay. The orchestra has released several recordings on the Analekta label, including a complete set of Beethoven's symphonies and has annual concert season in July and August.

See also
 List of symphony orchestras
 Canadian classical music

References

External links
 
Audio: Concert by the Orchestre de la Francophonie at the Forum mondial de la langue française, Quebec City, 2012 (broadcast on Radio Canada) 

2001 establishments in Quebec
Canadian orchestras
Musical groups established in 2001
Musical groups from Montreal